Ford Lake is a fresh water artificial reservoir located in Washtenaw County in the U.S. state of Michigan. The lake was created from the construction of Ford Lake Dam (originally known as Rawsonville Dam) along the Huron River in the early 1930s. The lake is named after business magnate Henry Ford.

The lake continues the flow of the Huron River, beginning approximately at the Interstate 94 bridge crossing in the city of Ypsilanti and ends at Ford Lake Dam along Bridge Road in Ypsilanti Township. A short distance after the Ford Lake Dam, the Huron River continues into Belleville Lake, which itself is a reservoir created by the French Landing Dam and Powerhouse.

Recreation
Ford Lake is a recreational site for boating, personal watercraft, canoeing/kayaking, and fishing. Portions of the Border-to-Border Trail run along Ford Lake and are popular among bicyclists.  There are four public lakeshore parks within Ypsilanti Township: Ford Lake Park, Huron River Park, Loonfeather Point Park, and North Bay Park. The only boat launch for motorized vessels on the lake is within Ford Lake Park.

Common fish within Ford Lake include bullhead catfish, channel catfish, common carp, crappies, northern pike, smallmouth bass, suckers, sunfish, bluegill, walleye, white bass, and yellow perch. The lake was once used by the Michigan Department of Natural Resources to stock various fish, including tiger muskellunge, which are no longer present in Ford Lake. The largest fish caught in Ford Lake is a common carp recorded in the state's Master Angler Entries at 36.25 inches (97.08 cm) long.

Health concerns

Ford Lake often experiences algal blooms late in the summer, which must be frequently tested to determine their level of toxicity. The Washtenaw County Health Department and Michigan Department of Health and Human Services monitors the water quality and issues advisories when the bacteria levels in the water may pose a health threat. Most algal blooms are green algae and pose no threat, but accumulating cyanobacteria and perfluorooctanesulfonatecan (PFOS) can result in harmful algal blooms that can have negative health affects. When this bacteria is present, prolonged contact with the water is not advised, although occasional contact with PFOS is not considered a health concern. Regardless of water quality, swimming is not a common recreational activity on the lake.

When algae levels reach a high enough level to pose a threat, a "Do Not Eat" fish advisory is issued and posted at all access points along Ford Lake. Boating and fishing are still allowed, but fishermen are advised to catch and release only.

References

Bodies of water of Washtenaw County, Michigan
Reservoirs in Michigan
Ypsilanti, Michigan
1931 establishments in Michigan
Huron River (Michigan)